Hell's Bells is a 1929 animated short film which was directed by Ub Iwerks and was distributed into cinemas by the film company Columbia Pictures, who would also distribute other Walt Disney films, such as Winter. The film follows Satan and the other devils' happenings in Hell. One of these devils revolts against Satan, and end up kicking him off the cliff of Hell at the end of the film.

The title means that the events in this film represent a degree of music, as bells is a musical instrument. The name also as serves as a rhyming couplet, as the word "Bells", rhymes with "Hell's".

The film also has a variety of musical compositions, one of such is "In the Hall of the Mountain King", which was written by the Norwegian composer Edvard Grieg. This composition is used near the end of the film, as Satan gets kicked off the cliff by one of his demons. Another is "Funeral March of a Marionette" by French composer Charles Gounod, which is familiar also as the theme tune to the television series  "Alfred Hitchcock Presents".

Copyrighted on February 7, 1930, but released on October 30 the year before, the film is part of the short film series Silly Symphonies. This series is the same that released other Disney films, such as Cannibal Capers, and El Terrible Toreador.

 Plot 

The film begins with fire consuming the screen and leaving behind Hell. Several bats fly through the sky and a spider descends from a web. This spider swings back and forward multiple times, swallowing the camera several times as well. The spider does this until fire from below swallows him and drags him down. After that, an alligator snares at the camera and climbs into the hole which the spider was dragged down by the fire. A three-headed dog, then approaches the camera and the heads snare at the camera. After that, a bat flies into a section where a large snake occupies. The bat intimidates the snake, by blowing a raspberry at the snake. This results in the snake eating the bat. However, after he does this, the snake comically grows wings and comically flies away.

An orchestra then plays some music, to entertain Satan. The orchestra is a mix between traditional instruments and nonsensical ones, as one of the creatures is playing a saxophone, whilst another one is comically playing a rib cage in place of a cello. A demon then begins to dance to the music, occasionally flying to it as well. Then, other devils begin to dance to the music. They do this until they cease naturally and walk away. However, one of the creatures walks into a piece of crumbling rock, and comically becomes crooked as a result. He dances some more in order to cease his crooked state. However, once he ceases to be crooked and begins to walk back, he comically walks into the same rock again, which results in him comically becoming crooked again.

Satan laughs at the occurrence, and rings a bell, to signal his lack of food and his desire to be fed. Upon hearing the bell, three creatures comically milk a cow-like creature for some milk which is as comically hot as fire, which they bring to Satan. He finds the milk pleasing, as he gulps it down in quick succession. After that, Satan picks up one of the little demons and feeds him to the three-headed dog seen earlier. Satan laughs and proceeds to try to grab another little demon. The demon, not wanting to gain the same fate as the other little demon, refuses and tries to step away from Satan.

This angers Satan, who leaps from his throne and begins to chase him through Hell in order to attempt to catch the little demon. The chase leads them to a cliff, where the little demon hides in a section of the cliff. Satan attempts to look from him. However, when he attempts this, Satan is kicked off the cliff by the little demon. Satan then tumbles down the cliff. During this, Satan tries to grab onto a ledge. This makes his body stretch out like an accordion. The fire below then comically tug at his tail and also spank him. The fire then drag Satan down, ultimately killing him. The film ends with the fire consuming the screen, and leaving behind a 'The End' card.

 Characters 
In this film, there a variety of characters. One of these is Satan. He is enthroned of Hell and rules it. He commands the other creatures and demons on their doings. He ultimately dies at the end of the film, as he is kicked off a cliff by one of his servants. Another character is the demons. They entertain Satan during the film with music. They also serve him meals, such as fire milk. Another character is the three headed dog. It breaks the fourth wall at the start of the cartoon, by snaring at the camera and the audience. It also eats one of the demons, as Satan gives him it near the end of the film.

 Reception Hell's Bells received mixed reviews by the cinema magazines at that time.The Film Daily (November 17, 1929): "Ace Cartoon: Another of the Silly Symphony series, with the cartoon work outdoing previous efforts in its ingenuity. With Hades as the scene of action and a set of grotesque animals of all sizes as the performers, the reel is continuously amusing as well as fascinating. The graceful contortions and rhythmic gyrations of the dumb caricatures evoke both laughter and wonder."Variety (November 20, 1929): "Moving cartoon picturing Hades as the weirdest of places with its inhabitants in odd animal forms. All comedy of the ghost-story type. Such as one musician using the backbone and hips of a human as his cello. Another instrument in this band is a pool of bubbling lava, one of the devils piercing the bubbles with his spiked tail to make music. While Satan drinks his white-hot milk direct from the udder of a dragon cow. Lot of laughs from the unnatural comedy effects a cartoonist can create and a peach filler."The Film Daily (November 23, 1929): "Few Laughs: Hell's Bells is evidently a follow-up on the success of The Skeleton Dance, but it does not approach that offering in laugh possibilities. It is pretentious as cartoons go. Full of fire and brimstone with a sort of a Jack-and-the-Beanstalk finish that is the best thing in it."

 Home media 
The short was released on December 19, 2006 on Walt Disney Treasures: More Silly Symphonies, Volume Two''.

References

External links 
 
 

1929 short films
1929 horror films
1929 animated films
1929 films
1920s American animated films
American comedy horror films
1920s comedy horror films
Films set in hell
1929 comedy films
American animated short films
Columbia Pictures short films
Columbia Pictures animated short films
The Devil in film
Films directed by Ub Iwerks